Silviu Nicolae Balaure; born 6 February 1996) is a Romanian professional footballer who plays as winger for Liga I club FC Hermannstadt.

Club career
In May 2016, Balaure signed a contract with first division club Astra Giurgiu.

Honours

Club
Astra Giurgiu
Cupa României runner-up: 2016–17, 2018–19, 2020–21
Supercupa României: 2016

References

External links
 
 
 

1996 births
Living people
People from Drobeta-Turnu Severin
Romanian footballers
Association football midfielders
Association football wingers
Romania youth international footballers
Romania under-21 international footballers
Liga I players
Liga II players
Liga III players
ACS Poli Timișoara players
CS Minaur Baia Mare (football) players
FC Astra Giurgiu players
FC Hermannstadt players